Jan Jonkers (born 29 August 1955) is a former Dutch racing cyclist. He rode in the 1980 and 1981 Tour de France.

References

External links
 

1955 births
Living people
Dutch male cyclists
People from Halderberge
Cyclists from North Brabant
20th-century Dutch people